Benjamin Bryant (born 1977) is a Germany-born American writer, broadcaster, and filmmaker. Serving as a government official in the Obama Administration and Biden Administrations, he also works as an artist and actor. During the Afghan evacuation in 2021, Bryant coordinated the emergency evacuation of Afghan allies and families, and served as a spokesperson for the "Digital Dunkirk" coalition.

Bryant wrote and directed the feature film Station to Station, and sitcom "Aidy Kane (Really Wants You to Love Him)." He co-executive produced the drama Anacostia, and hosts “The Brink with Benjamin Bryant.” As an actor, Bryant portrays "Gregory Marshall" on the serial Forever and a Day, a role for which he received a 2022 Indie Series Award.

Bryant served on the Pentagon’s Fort Hood Shooting Task Force, “Don't Ask, Don't Tell” Repeal Working Group, the Military Compensation and Retirement Modernization Commission, and the United States Vietnam War Commemoration. In 2011, the Dolph Briscoe Center for American History at the University of Texas at Austin announced the formal acquisition of several of Bryant's papers, notes, and recordings. He has led Washington D.C.-based Bryant Zamberlan Group since 2010.

Early life and education 
Bryant was born in Nuremberg, Germany to American parents in a military family. His father is Brigadier General Albert Bryant Jr. He is also the nephew of writer and speaker Lori Bryant-Woolridge.

Bryant graduated from Giessen American High School in Giessen, Germany in 1994, commencing study at the University of Texas at Austin, that same year.  At Texas, he studied journalism and communication studies from 1994 to 1998, when an extended illness led to medical withdrawal prior to graduation. Bryant completed his Bachelor of Science degree at New York’s Excelsior University.

In 2015, Bryant graduated with both a Master of Science in Organization development and Leadership, and a Master of Arts in Administration, from the University of the Incarnate Word in San Antonio, Texas.

Career 
In 1996, Bryant was serving as a radio news intern at Austin radio station KKMJ when the Atlanta Olympic Bombing occurred. Following coverage of his impromptu overnight reporting by Austin American-Statesman columnist Jane Grieg, he was offered a regular on-air role at KKMJ and named Program Director for sister station, KJCE.

Bryant later worked as a freelance journalist and columnist before focusing on public relations and crisis communications consulting. He was a writer and editor for the Deepwater News and FHP&R: Force Health Protection & Readiness magazine. He returned to broadcasting as the host of the “BZCast” podcast in 2017, including an exploration of leaking and whistleblowing in the federal government, and in 2018 with “The Brink with Benjamin Bryant,” a series of one-on-one interviews focusing on Washington D.C. notables, and its spin-off serialized investigative podcast.  In 2018, Bryant also appeared in a non-partisan public service announcement entitled "The One Place Everyone is Equal."

In 2005, Bryant served as a speechwriter for Rear Admiral Patrick Stillman of the United States Coast Guard, Ellen Embrey, then-Deputy Assistant Secretary of Defense for Force Health Protection and Readiness, and communications advisor for James Finley, then-Deputy Undersecretary of Defense for Acquisition and Technology during the George W. Bush administration. Bryant worked on the Pentagon's Fort Hood Shooting Task Force, “Don’t Ask, Don’t Tell” Repeal Working Group, and the Military Compensation and Retirement Modernization Commission, for which he was the agency's final spokesperson. In the 2010s, Bryant made multiple appearances on America Tonight speaking to military issues in the news.

Since 2010, Bryant has served as an auxiliarist in the United States Coast Guard Auxiliary, including as a Flotilla Staff Officer. Since 2010, Bryant has been the Managing Partner of the Bryant Zamberlan Group of companies, which include a global communications and organizational development consultancy, TV/film production capability, and BZ/MP, a non-profit news/information and media distribution endeavor.

In 2011, news reports covered Bryant and Thomas Zamberlan's donation of their original editor's copies from several Presidential and DoD task forces to the Smithsonian Institution. That same year, the Dolph Briscoe Center for American History at Bryant's alma mater University of Texas at Austin, acquired Bryant's personal notes, papers, and recorded recollections related to his work on the Fort Hood investigation and "Don't Ask, Don't Tell" repeals.

In 2022, Bryant returned to government task force and commission work, joining The United States of America Vietnam War Commemoration as Chief of Staff for Task Force 23/Operation Welcome Home, the task force within the commission charged with planning and executing a three-day 50th anniversary commemoration in May 2023 – including ceremonies, historical displays, and a multi-media concert on the National Mall – in recognition of the service and sacrifices of Vietnam War-era veterans and their families.

Task forces and commissions

Digital Dunkirk 
In 2021, during the weeks leading up to the withdrawal of American troops and international presence from Afghanistan, Bryant facilitated the emergency evacuation of Afghan allies and their families and served as a planner and spokesperson for the "Digital Dunkirk" coalition of former and current military, diplomatic personnel, and government civilians working to coordinate evacuations.

Film, television and radio 

Bryant began producing narrative television and film projects in 2016, first joining the digital series Anacostia at the start of its fifth season, as a supervising producer. Beginning with episode five, Bryant was named co-executive producer of the series, a role he continued until September 2019. He occasionally recurred on the series in the role of news anchor "James Vance," an homage to Washington D.C. news anchor Jim Vance.

In 2019, the Bryant Zamberlan Group partnered with Gemelli Films and writer-director Candice Cain to produce the first three entries in the "Candy Cain" series of holiday films, Ivy & Mistletoe, starring Cody Calafiore, Carrie Genzel, and Cynthia Gibb; The Maltese Holiday, starring Calafiore, Clayton Snyder, and Abigail Hawk; and Magic in Mount Holly, starring Calafiore, Genzel, Patrick Muldoon, Frank Whaley, Terri Garber, and Jennifer Bassey. Bryant was also an associate producer on Cain's Joy & Hope a western-themed romance co-starring Vivica A. Fox.

In 2020, Bryant began production on the sports comedy Aidy Kane, but suspended filming in March 2020 due to coronavirus pandemic. He later repackaged the existing footage with newly shot scenes into the four-time ISA-nominated sitcom, "Aidy Kane (Really Wants You to Love Him." That year, Bryant also debuted in the series regular role of troubled businessman "Gregory Marshall" on the dramatic serial Forever and a Day.

Bryant has appeared in three of writer-director Brooke B's "Script Out Loud" audio feature productions, Birthday Blues, Selling the Act, and All I Want for Christmas is Drew, and the Brooke B audio series "Dirty Laundry", in supporting roles, and portrayed "Nolan," the Nutcracker Prince, in JLJ Media's podcast special The Sugar Plum Fairy and the Nutcracker from Molina Productions, a role he reprised as a series regular on "The New Adventures of the Tooth Fairy" series from the same team.

Station to Station 

During the 2020 coronavirus lockdown, Bryant began writing the psychological drama, Station to Station, directing the film on location in September, keeping cast and crew in an isolated "bubble" to adhere to COVID-19 health and safety protocols. In 2021, the film began its festival run, marking Bryant's official debut as a feature film writer and director.

Markos Papadatos of Digital Journal called the film "compelling" and "bold," and K.P. Smith of We Are Entertainment News called it "deeply satisfying." Both reviewers compared Bryant's work to that of writer-directors Paul Thomas Anderson and Richard Linklater. Station to Station won "Best Narrative Feature," "Best Actor," and "Best Ensemble" in June 2021 at the IndieEye Film Awards and received multiple honors from IndieFEST and FILMHAUS Berlin in the following months.  Bryant was specifically recognized by FILMHAUS with "first-time director" and "original concept" nominations.

In October 2021, the Las Vegas International Film and Screenwriting Festival announced Station to Station as both an Official Selection and the festival's opening night feature. The film premiered in competition, earning eight jury nominations, including as a finalist for the festival's Best Drama Feature, winning two, and was selected by attendees to receive the 2021 "Audience Award." On January 8, 2022, Station to Station was released via virtual cinema in the United States.

Awards and honors 
In December 1996, Bryant was named by the Austin American-Statesman as one of its year's "most memorable." Bryant received a 2010 Platinum MarCom "Special Category" Award for his work as the Managing Editor of the report of the Fort Hood Task Force, 2012 Davey Award for his appearances on "America Tonight," 2019 Communicator Award of Distinction for "The Brink with Benjamin Bryant" interview specials; and multiple Platinum AVA and Hermes Creative Awards for "The Brink with Benjamin Bryant: INTERSECTIONS" podcast. Bryant won a 2020 Hermes Creative Award for the trailer for "Journeys Beyond."

In 2022, Bryant received six nominations (the second highest of any individual nominee that year) for the 12th Annual Indie Series Awards, including nominations for "Best Comedy Series" and "Best Supporting Actor - Comedy" nominations for "Aidy Kane (Really Wants You to Love Him)" and "Best Actor - Audio Fiction" for his second season performance as "Gregory Marshall" in "Forever and a Day." At the ceremony on April 9, 2022, Bryant and his "Forever and a Day" season two castmates won the awards program's inaugural "Best Ensemble - Audio Fiction" award.

Filmography

Film

Television and streaming

Radio and podcasts

References

External links 

 
Bryant Zamberlan Group*

Lyon, Lacretia (2020-09-16). Benjamin Bryant, pt. 1 and (2020-09-23). Benjamin Bryant, pt. 2, BLEAV Podcast Network. Retrieved 2020-11-09.
 
 
 

American television news anchors
American television reporters and correspondents
1977 births
Living people
African-American journalists
African-American television hosts
African-American television personalities
American male journalists
Moody College of Communication alumni
Excelsior College alumni
University of the Incarnate Word alumni
American civil servants
20th-century American journalists
21st-century American journalists
United States Army civilians
United States Department of Defense officials
American journalists of Chinese descent
American radio DJs
American radio news anchors
American television producers
American painters
American press secretaries
American podcasters
20th-century African-American people
21st-century African-American people
African-American Catholics